The Worthing and District Football League was a football competition based in Sussex, England.

For the 2014–15 season the league was absorbed into the Brighton, Hove & District Football League.

Recent Division Winners

Recent Cup Winners

See also 
 Sport in Worthing

External links
Worthing & District League on FA Full-Time

 
Sport in Worthing
Football in West Sussex
Defunct football leagues in England